Tanawat Phonnaku, also known as Inthanon Sithchamuang (born: January, 12  1987 in Sakon Nakhon province), is a Thai professional boxer.

Professional boxing record 

He lost to Kohei Kono for the World Boxing Association world super flyweight world title.

Phonnaku holds a defeat by Jerwin Ancajas and Mark Anthony Geraldo.

In November 2016, Hirofumi Mukai defeated world title contender Tanawat Phonnaku to claim Tso’s vacated WBO Asia-Pacific Junior Bantamweight title.

References 

1987 births
Flyweight boxers
Living people
Inthanon Sithchamuang
Inthanon Sithchamuang